While I Was Gone is a 2004 CBS television film about Jo, a veterinarian, unhappy in her life and in her marriage to Daniel (Bill Smitrovich), a local minister. Whilst treating a dog, she learns that the animal belongs to Eli Mayhew (Peter Horton), a former college friend of hers, and Jo's past as a radical student during the 1960s comes back to life. Her restlessness and discontent increase and Jo wonders if her life could have turned out differently.

Story
Jo Beckett (Alley) leads a comfortable life with a successful veterinary practice, a devoted husband, Reverend Daniel Beckett (Bill Smitrovich), and a beautiful home in a lovely small town outside of Boston. Still, she is strangely dissatisfied with her life. One day, while sitting in a boat with her husband, Jo has an out-of-body experience during which she looks down upon the boat and does not see herself in it. As she describes the feeling to Daniel later that evening, she feels that the experience is some sort of premonition.

One afternoon, a man brings his dog into her veterinary practice to be treated, and Jo recognizes him as Eli (Peter Horton), a former housemate from her bohemian days more than 20 years ago, who is now married and has moved to her small town. Although they were never involved in the past, Eli is still attractive to Jo and when he invites her to lunch at a fancy hotel in Boston, she goes with the intention of sleeping with him. Instead, Eli reveals a secret to Jo that returns her to the darkest moments of her past and threatens to destroy life as she knows it.

Cast
Kirstie Alley as Jo Beckett
Bill Smitrovich as Daniel Beckett
Janaya Stephens as Cass Beckett
Peter Horton as Eli Mayhew
Kim Poirier as Dana Jablonski
Deborah Odell as Sylvia
Sandra Caldwell as Betty
Rebecca Benson as Young Jo Beckett
Jeff Topping as Young Eli Mayhew
Ryan Kennedy as Duncan
Adam Smoluk as Larry
Tyler Hynes as Malky McDowell
River Ferreira as Jesus Martinez
Kevin Williams as Byron Hall
Shauna MacDonald as Detective Geary
Bill Lake as Sergeant Eberhart

External links 
 

2004 television films
2004 films
2004 drama films
CBS network films
Films based on American novels
Films directed by Mike Robe
2000s English-language films